Thomas William Manning (June 28, 1946 – July 29, 2019) was an American militant convicted of killing a New Jersey State Police trooper during a routine traffic stop in 1981. Before and after the murder he was involved with a Marxist organization, the United Freedom Front (UFF), which bombed a series of US military and commercial institutes and committed bank robberies in the 1970s and early 1980s.

The son of a Boston postal clerk, he shined shoes and raised pigeons, in his early youth, before finding work as a stock boy.  He joined the US Military in 1963, and the following year was stationed at Guantanamo Bay, Cuba before being transferred off to spend the following year in the Vietnam War. Some time shortly after 1965, he was sentenced by a Massachusetts state court to five years in prison for armed robbery and assault, serving the last ten months in MCI-Cedar Junction. He later claimed that during these years that he became heavily politicized, through his interactions with other prisoners.

After his release in 1971, he married Carol and together they had three children: Jeremy, Tamara, and Jonathan.

Together with his arrest for the bombings, Manning was also convicted for his role in killing New Jersey police officer Philip Lamonaco during a traffic stop on December 21, 1981. The killings launched the largest manhunt in New Jersey police history, and ended with the arrests of Raymond and Patricia Levasseur, Richard Williams, Jaan Laaman, and Barbara Curzi on November 4, 1984, and Tom and Carol Manning, on April 24, 1985. All were associated with the United Freedom Front. He pleaded self-defense at his trial. He was sentenced to life in prison on February 19, 1987.

In September 2006, the University of Southern Maine removed Manning's artwork from an art presentation, and apologized for allowing him to be heralded as a "political prisoner" by event organizers.

Manning's projected release date was September 28, 2020. Manning died in prison in Bruceton Mills, West Virginia on July 29, 2019, aged 73.

External links
 Manning's personal website
, a film about the killing of Philip Lamonaco

References

1946 births
2019 deaths
American bank robbers
American people of Irish descent
American Marxists
American people convicted of assault
American people convicted of murdering police officers
American people convicted of robbery
American people who died in prison custody
Inmates of ADX Florence
People convicted of murder by the United States federal government
Prisoners and detainees of Massachusetts
American military personnel of the Vietnam War
Prisoners sentenced to life imprisonment by the United States federal government
Prisoners who died in United States federal government detention